Emiliano González is the name of:

Emiliano González Arqués (born 1969), Andorran footballer
Emiliano González Navero (1861–1934), Paraguyan politician